The Juno Award for Heavy Metal Album of the Year is an annual award, presented by the Canadian Academy of Recording Arts and Sciences (CARAS) to honor the year's best album by a Canadian artist in the genres of heavy metal. The album is open to all subgenres of heavy metal. Rock, punk, crossover and hardcore artists are not eligible for this category.

The award was introduced by the Juno Awards in September 2011, and was presented for the first time at the 2012 Juno Awards. The five nominees and winner in the category are chosen by a panel of judges selected from the Canadian music industry. The award was named "Juno Award for Metal/Hard Music Album of the Year" from 2011 to 2015, and it was renamed for the 2016 ceremony "in order to more clearly define the category criteria".

Recipients

Metal/Hard Music Album of the Year (2012–2015)

Heavy Metal Album of the Year (2016–present)

References

Heavy Metal
Album awards
Rock music awards
Heavy metal music